Blagoy Ivanov (born October 9, 1986) is a Bulgarian mixed martial artist and Sambo practitioner. He is  currently signed to the Ultimate Fighting Championship (UFC), where he competes in the  Heavyweight division. He was the  2008 Combat Sambo World Champion and  the former World Series of Fighting Heavyweight champion. As of March 13, 2023, he is #14 in the UFC heavyweight rankings.

Background 
Blagoy has  competed in Judo as a heavyweight national representative for Bulgaria. He competed in the 2003 Balkan Junior Championships and placed first. He then continued in competition up to the European Championships level but only placed 7th in the 2007 U23 Tournament, and did not make an attempt to represent Bulgaria in the 2008 Olympic games. Ivanov chose to enter into a career in mixed martial arts as opposed to representing Bulgaria in the 2012 Olympic Games.

Sambo career
He notably defeated four-time World Combat Sambo Champion and mixed-martial arts fighter Fedor Emelianenko in the semi-finals of the 2008 World Sambo Championships on November 16, 2008. (He went on to win the finals over Germany's Janosch Stefan the following day.) Ivanov previously faced Emelianenko in February 2008 at Russia's Presidents Cup Sambo competition, losing the match to Emelianenko.

Mixed martial arts career
Ivanov started a career in mixed martial arts in his home country (2 wins and 1 NC) before going to World Victory Road, where he signed a three-fight deal.  His first fight took place at Sengoku 9 where he defeated Pride FC veteran, Kazuyuki Fujita by split decision, breaking both hands in the process.

Ivanov was set next to face Fedor's brother, Aleksander Emelianenko, but that fight and eventually the entire event on which the fight should have occurred was canceled because Blagoy had broken both his hands in the fight against Fujita and was not able to heal and prepare properly for his fight with Aleksander.

Recently, in the capital city of Bulgaria - Sofia, Bagata defeated another well-known Bulgarian MMA fighter Svetoslav Zahariev who was European champion in grappling, heavyweight division. In the interview given after the fight, Bagata said that he was ready for a rematch with Svetoslav, but also with his brother, who is a fighter too. He added that he needs more easy matches like the last one in order to get in shape for the real challenges. According to Blagoy, in December 2010 he would go to fight and train in Las Vegas, USA.

Bellator MMA

On March 15, 2011, Ivanov announced that he had signed a deal to fight for Bellator. He debuted on March 26, 2011, at Bellator 38 against William Penn and won via first-round TKO.

Ivanov was expected to face Thiago Santos as part of a quarterfinals tournament at Bellator 52 on October 1 at the L'Audberge du Lac Casino Resort in Lake Charles, La. The tournament was to determine a No. 1 contender to face champion Cole Konrad. Santos, however, was unable to travel from Brazil for the event and was replaced by Zak Jensen.

Ivanov defeated Jensen by technical submission due to a guillotine choke at 2:35 into round 2. The 2008 Combat Sambo World Champion Ivanov used superior boxing technique, speed, and accuracy to bloody the face, Jensen, in round one. Jensen offered little offense, and it bordered on a 10–8 round. An outside trip takedown from Ivanov started off the second frame, where he immediately began to crank on an Americana attempt. Jensen gave up full mount attempting to defend. Eventually, Jensen was able to scramble out, but as he drove forward attempting to push Ivanov against the fence he left his neck exposed. Ivanov locked in a tight guillotine choke that left Jensen unconscious and unable to tap. The impressive performance from Ivanov furthers his career-winning streak to eleven.

On 24 Dec 2011, Ivanov defeated Ricco Rodriguez in the third round via TKO with a kick to the upper body that some felt hit Rodriguez's head, as he was still getting up from his knees.  The fight took place in Chekhov, Moscow suburb, and Ivanov fought under the Russian banner.

Return to MMA
Ivanov returned to MMA competition after a 21-month absence due to injuries sustained in a bar fight and fought Manny Lara on September 13, 2013 at Bellator 99. He won the fight via submission in the first round.

Ivanov next fought on November 22, 2013, at Bellator 109 and faced Keith Bell. Ivanov was initially dropped by Bell early into the fight, but recovered and won the fight via submission.

In March 2014, Ivanov returned to the Heavyweight division.  He faced Rich Hale in the opening round of the Bellator Season 10 Heavyweight tournament at Bellator 111 on March 7, 2014.  He won the fight via unanimous decision.  He faced Lavar Johnson in the semifinals at Bellator 116 on April 11, 2014 and won via submission in the first round. He faced Alexander Volkov in the tournament final on May 17, 2014 at Bellator 120. He lost the fight via submission in the second round, resulting in his first professional loss.

World Series of Fighting
On January 24, 2015 it was announced that Ivanov signed with WSOF.

In his debut, Ivanov faced Smealinho Rama for the WSOF Heavyweight championship at WSOF 21 on June 5, 2015  He won the fight and championship due to a submission in the third round.

Ivanov made his first title defense against Derrick Mehmen at WSOF 24 on October 17, 2015. He won the fight via TKO in the second round.

For his second title defense, Ivanov faced Josh Copeland at WSOF 31 on June 17, 2016. He won the fight via unanimous decision (49–46, 49–46, and 48–47).

For his third title defense, Ivanov faced Shawn Jordan. The bout was originally scheduled for February 28 (incorrectly reported as Feb 25) but was rescheduled to March 18, 2017. Ivanov won the fight via TKO in the first round.

Ultimate Fighting Championship 
On April 25, 2018, it was reported that Ivanov was signed by Ultimate Fighting Championship. He made his UFC debut against former UFC Heavyweight champion Junior dos Santos on July 14 at UFC Fight Night 133. He lost the fight via unanimous decision.

In his second fight for the promotion, Ivanov faced Ben Rothwell on March 9, 2019 at UFC Fight Night 146. He won the fight by unanimous decision.

In his third fight with the company, Ivanov faced Tai Tuivasa on June 8, 2019 at UFC 238. He won the fight by unanimous decision.

Ivanov faced Derrick Lewis on November 2, 2019 at UFC 244. He lost the fight via split decision.

Ivanov was scheduled to face Augusto Sakai on May 9, 2020 at UFC 250. However, on April 9, Dana White, the president of UFC announced that this event was postponed and the bout eventually took place on May 30, 2020 at UFC on ESPN: Woodley vs. Burns. He lost the fight via a split decision.

Ivanov was expected to face Marcin Tybura on March 27, 2021 at UFC 260. However, Ivanov was pulled from the bout, citing injury.

Ivanov faced Marcos Rogério de Lima on May 7, 2022 at UFC 274. He won the fight via unanimous decision.

Ivanov faced Marcin Tybura on February 4, 2023 at UFC Fight Night 218. He lost the fight via unanimous decision.

Bar fight incident
In the early morning of February 26, 2012, a group of eight men entered the bar "Ice" in Sofia and attacked Ivanov and his two friends. Ivanov was stabbed below the sternum and a lung was damaged. He fought off all the attackers and hailed a cab to the hospital. He was in the intensive care unit after six hours of life-saving medical intervention at Sofia's Pirogov Hospital, his condition stabilized with the aid of an artificial respirator. He remained in critical care for several weeks.

The police apprehended a 23-year-old suspect, nicknamed Dampela ("The Dumbbell") with a long criminal record, and charged him with the stabbing.  Bulgaria's Interior Minister, Tsvetan Tsvetanov, used the speed of the arrest as an argument for success in the country's battle against organized crime, in a speech two days after the attack.

On March 5, 2012, Ivanov was reported to be in stable condition, having regained consciousness over the weekend. While his life was still considered to be in danger, he was switched to a milder treatment regimen.

Dampela claimed that Ivanov initiated the fight, at one point slapping Dampela in the face. Dampela had a criminal record of extortion, drug dealing, and fraudulent car registration. The defense claimed that Dampela did not know he stabbed Ivanov and went to the police immediately after finding out he did. The prosecution claimed that Dampela bragged about the incident and picked the fight with Ivanov in a drunken rage.

On March 12, 2012, Ivanov's condition deteriorated. A second surgery was performed and he was placed in an artificial coma. On May 19 Ivanov had been taken out of a medically induced coma, and had spoken with doctors. He was expected to make a full recovery in six months to a year. Dampela remained in permanent detention.

Around May 12, 2012, Ivanov regained the ability to talk and gave a brief press conference on the 19th in the hospital. He declared that he wanted to return to the ring and the doctors confirmed that he would be able to recover in six months to a year.

On May 28, Ivanov left the hospital's intensive care unit. He stated that he wanted to return to competition and doctors confirmed that he could return the next year.

Ivanov made his MMA return in September 2013 and won his next four fights.

Championships and Accomplishments
World Series of Fighting
WSOF Heavyweight Championship (1 time)
Three Successful Title Defenses

Professional Fighters League 
 PFL Heavyweight Championship (1 time) 
 One Successful Title Defense

Bellator MMA
Bellator Season 10 Heavyweight Tournament: Runner-Up

World Sambo Championships
World Champion: 2008 St. Petersburg 
World Semi-Finalist: 2006 Sofia

Mixed martial arts record

|-
|Loss
|align=center|19–5 (1)
|Marcin Tybura
|Decision (unanimous)
|UFC Fight Night: Lewis vs. Spivak
|
|align=center|3
|align=center|5:00
|Las Vegas, Nevada, United States
|
|-
|Win
|align=center|19–4 (1)
|Marcos Rogério de Lima
|Decision (unanimous)
|UFC 274
|
|align=center|3
|align=center|5:00
|Phoenix, Arizona, United States
|
|-
|Loss
|align=center|18–4 (1)
|Augusto Sakai
|Decision (split)
|UFC on ESPN: Woodley vs. Burns
|
|align=center|3
|align=center|5:00
|Las Vegas, Nevada, United States
|
|-
|Loss
|align=center|18–3 (1)
|Derrick Lewis
|Decision (split)
|UFC 244 
|
|align=center|3
|align=center|5:00
|New York City, New York, United States
|
|-
|Win
|align=center|18–2 (1)
|Tai Tuivasa
|Decision (unanimous)
|UFC 238 
|
|align=center|3
|align=center|5:00
|Chicago, Illinois, United States
|
|-
|Win
|align=center|17–2 (1)
|Ben Rothwell
|Decision (unanimous)
|UFC Fight Night: Lewis vs. dos Santos 
|
|align=center|3
|align=center|5:00
|Wichita, Kansas, United States
|
|-
|Loss
|align=center|16–2 (1)
|Junior dos Santos
|Decision (unanimous)
|UFC Fight Night: dos Santos vs. Ivanov 
|
|align=center|5
|align=center|5:00
|Boise, Idaho, United States
|
|-
|Win
|align=center|16–1 (1)
|Caio Alencar
|Decision (unanimous)
|PFL: Fight Night
|
|align=center|3
|align=center|5:00
|Washington, D.C., United States
| 
|-
|Win
|align=center|
|Shawn Jordan
|TKO (punches)
|WSOF 35
|
|align=center|1
|align=center|1:43
|Verona, New York, United States
| 
|-
|Win
|align=center|14–1 (1)
|Josh Copeland
|Decision (unanimous)
|WSOF 31
|
|align=center| 5
|align=center| 5:00
|Mashantucket, Connecticut, United States
|
|-
| Win
| align=center|13–1 (1)
| Derrick Mehmen
| TKO (punches)
| WSOF 24
| 
| align=center|2
| align=center| 4:33
| Mashantucket, Connecticut, United States
| 
|-
| Win
| align=center| 12–1 (1)
| Smealinho Rama
| Submission (guillotine choke)
| WSOF 21
| 
| align=center| 3
| align=center| 1:17
| Edmonton, Alberta, Canada
| 
|-
| Loss
| align=center| 11–1 (1)
| Alexander Volkov
| Submission (rear-naked choke)
| Bellator 120
| 
| align=center| 2
| align=center| 1:08
| Southaven, Mississippi, United States
| 
|-
| Win
| align=center| 11–0 (1)
| Lavar Johnson
| Submission (americana)
| Bellator 116
| 
| align=center| 1
| align=center| 4:08
| Temecula, California, United States
| 
|-
| Win
| align=center| 10–0 (1)
| Rich Hale
| Decision (unanimous)
| Bellator 111
| 
| align=center| 3
| align=center| 5:00
| Thackerville, Oklahoma, United States
| 
|-
| Win
| align=center| 9–0 (1)
| Keith Bell
| Submission (rear-naked choke)
| Bellator 109
| 
| align=center| 1
| align=center| 3:59
| Bethlehem, Pennsylvania, United States
| 
|-
| Win
| align=center| 8–0 (1)
| Manny Lara
| Submission (standing guillotine choke)
| Bellator 99
| 
| align=center| 1
| align=center| 1:17
| Temecula, California, United States
| 
|-
| Win
| align=center| 7–0 (1)
| Ricco Rodriguez
| TKO (retirement)
| Chekhov MMA Tournament
| 
| align=center| 3
| align=center| 3:33
| Chekhov, Russia
| 
|-
| Win
| align=center| 6–0 (1)
| Zak Jensen
| Technical Submission (guillotine choke)
| Bellator 52
| 
| align=center| 2
| align=center| 2:35
| Lake Charles, Louisiana, United States
| 
|-
| Win
| align=center| 5–0 (1)
| William Penn
| TKO (punches)
| Bellator 38
| 
| align=center| 1
| align=center| 2:58
| Tunica, Mississippi, United States
| 
|-
|  Win
| align=center| 4–0 (1) 
| Svetoslav Zahariev
| Submission (rear-naked choke)
| Real Pain Challenge 9
| 
| align=center| 1 
| align=center| 3:33
| Sofia, Bulgaria
| 
|-
|  Win
| align=center| 3–0 (1)
| Kazuyuki Fujita
| Decision (split)
| World Victory Road Presents: Sengoku 9
| 
| align=center| 3
| align=center| 5:00
| Saitama, Japan
| 
|-
| NC
| align=center| 2–0 (1)
| Ilir Latifi
| NC (ring broke)
| Real Pain Challenge 2
| 
| align=center| 1
| align=center| 0:55
| Sofia, Bulgaria
| 
|-
|  Win
| align=center| 2–0
| Yancho Dimitrov
| TKO (punches)
| Real Pain Challenge 1
| 
| align=center| 1
| align=center| 2:31
| Sofia, Bulgaria
| 
|-
|  Win
| align=center| 1–0
| Kamen Georgiev
| TKO (corner stoppage)
| Fitness Mania
| 
| align=center| 1
| align=center| 5:00
| Pazardzhik, Bulgaria
| 
|-

See also
 List of Bellator MMA alumni

References

External links
 
 

1986 births
Living people
Bulgarian male mixed martial artists
Bulgarian sambo practitioners
Heavyweight mixed martial artists
Sportspeople from Sofia
Bulgarian male judoka
People from Sandanski
Big Brother (Bulgarian TV series) contestants
Ultimate Fighting Championship male fighters
Mixed martial artists utilizing kickboxing
Mixed martial artists utilizing sambo
Mixed martial artists utilizing judo
21st-century Bulgarian people